The Latvian Railways Cup is an annual traditional international ice hockey tournament, with the participation of teams from the Kontinental Hockey League. It is sponsored by Latvian Railways.

References

Ice hockey tournaments in Latvia
Kontinental Hockey League